"Against a Wen" is an Old English metrical charm and medical text found in the London, British Library, Royal MS. 4A.XIV. It appears to describe a remedy for ridding oneself of a wen, which is an Old English term for a cyst or skin blemish. The charm is addressed to the wen itself, asking it to leave. The charm prescribes methods for curing the blemish, and describes it as it gradually shrinks until it disappears.

Charm Genre 
Along with eight other of the Anglo-Saxon Metrical charms, Grendon classifies the "Against a Wen" charm under class A: "Exorcisms of diseases or disease-spirit" due to its verbal incantation element. The performative speech within a ritual context is a defining feature of the charm genre. Characteristics common to the charm genre which appear in the "Against a wen" charm include an explanatory title, instructions or directions to carry out the ritual and a written incantation or chant. It is also classified within the category of dealing with demon-disease a common element to the charm genre where the perceived demon or spirit is lured out with flattery or threat. The "Against a wen" charm employs the former tactic of a cajoling tone when addressing the wen and asking it to leave. Rather than performing the charm on a person, the patient's body is perceived as the host for an evil spirit in which the ritual attempts to expel.

Christianity and the Charm 
Pagan idols were replaced with Christian substitutes such as “Christ”, saints or the disciples and any mention of the original pagan gods were eradicated. The clergy viewed the pagan practise of charms as demonic. Aelfric's collection of Old English homilies and saints' lives found in MS li.1.33 in the Cambridge University Library. His homily on the passion of Saint Bartholomew the Apostle (folios 82r to 91r) documents his condemnation of such practises and features a warning against the use of heathen magic in which he outlines the Christian parameters within which medicinal rituals are acceptable.The wise Augustine said, that it is not perilous, though any one eat a medicinal herb; but he reprehends it as an unallowed charm, if any one bind those herbs on himself, unless he lay them on a sore. Nevertheless we should not set our hope in medicinal herbs, but in the Almighty Creator, who has given that virtue to those herbs. No man shall enchant a herb with magic, but with God's words shall bless it, and so eat it.
Out of the twelve Anglo-Saxon Metrical charms, nine contain religious references and five ending with Amen.

Charm text 
Against a wen                                                                      Against a Wen

Appearances in popular culture

The charm appears on Season 5 Episode 18 "Baldur" of "Baldur" of Vikings when Queen Judith seeks the help of a witch for a breast tumor.

References

Editions
 Elliott Van Kirk Dobbie, The Anglo-Saxon Minor Poems, vol. VI of The Anglo-Saxon Poetic Record, Columbia University Press, New York, 1942. /0-231-08770-5
 Karl Young,  Seven Anglo-Saxon Charms
 Foys, Martin et al. Old English Poetry in Facsimile Project (Center for the History of Print and Digital Culture, University of Wisconsin-Madison, 2019-); digital facsimile edition and Modern English translation

External links
This charm is edited, annotated and linked to digital images of its manuscript pages, with translation, in the Old English Poetry in Facsimile Project: https://oepoetryfacsimile.org/
 'Old English Text' (Original Old English Text of 'Against a Ƿen').
 'Seven Anglo-Saxon Charms' (Translation of 'Against a Wen')

Old English medicine
Anglo-Saxon metrical charms